is a former Japanese football player.

Club career
Tsujimoto was born in Suita on 23 June 1979. After graduating from Kindai University High School, he joined Yokohama Flügels in 1998. However the club was disbanded end of 1998 season due to financial strain, he moved to Kyoto Purple Sanga with contemporaries Yasuhito Endo, Kazuki Teshima and so on in 1999. He played for the club until 2005. From 2006, he played for Tokushima Vortis (2006), Sagawa Printing (2007–08) and FC Osaka (2009). He retired end of 2009 season.

National team career
In August 1995, Tsujimoto was selected Japan U-17 national team for 1995 U-17 World Championship and he played 1 match. In April 1999, he was also selected Japan U-20 national team for 1999 World Youth Championship. At 1999 World Youth Championship, he played as right back of three back defense with Kazuki Teshima and Koji Nakata. He played full-time in all 7 matches and Japan won the 2nd place.

Club statistics

Honors and awards
 FIFA World Youth Championship runner-up: 1999

References

External links

1979 births
Living people
Association football people from Osaka Prefecture
People from Suita
Japanese footballers
Japan youth international footballers
J1 League players
J2 League players
Japan Football League players
Yokohama Flügels players
Kyoto Sanga FC players
Tokushima Vortis players
SP Kyoto FC players
FC Osaka players
Association football defenders